Castle Rock Butte is a summit in Butte County, South Dakota, in the United States.

The Castle Rock Butte was used by Native Americans, explorers and early settlers as a lookout and reference point during their travels. The butte looked to many travelers like a castle on a hill. The name is credited to Dr. Edwin James, a botanist on Long's Expedition of 1820. The town of Castle Rock is named after this solitary natural landmark.

Castle Rock was so named on account of its castle-like outline.

References

Landforms of Butte County, South Dakota
Mountains of South Dakota